Alexander Scholz (born 24 October 1992) is a Danish professional footballer who plays as a centre back for J.League club Urawa Red Diamonds

Early life 
Scholz' parents are German. He was raised in the Vejle area in Denmark.

Club career 
Scholz started his career with Hedensted IF, before being scouted by Vejle Boldklub. He later moved to Stjarnan in Iceland. In 2012, Belgian team Lokeren started scouting him following a tip from their former player Arnar Grétarsson, who had seen Scholz play in Iceland. Based on these scouting reports, Lokeren signed Scholz in December 2012, giving him a contract until 2015. Just a few days later on 19 January 2013, he made his debut in the Belgian top league in a 2–6 won away match against OH Leuven. He scored the winning goal in a 1–0 win for Lokeren in the final of the 2014 Belgian Cup Final.

Scholz signed a five-year contract with FC Midtjylland in August 2018. On 1 December 2020, Scholz scored a goal for FC Midtjylland in a UEFA Champions League group stage match against Atalanta; the final score was 1–1.

On 31 May 2021, it was announced that Scholz had signed a contract with J1 League club Urawa Red Diamonds. There, he would join his compatriot Kasper Junker, who had signed with the Japanese club a month prior.

International career
In November 2020, he was called up to Kasper Hjulmand's senior squad for the friendly against Sweden due to several cancellations from, among others, the Danish national team players playing in England, due to the COVID-19 restrictions, as well as a case of COVID-19 in the squad, which had put several national team players in quarantine.

Career statistics

Club

Honours 
Lokeren
 Belgian Cup: 2013–14

Standard Liège
 Belgian Cup: 2015–16

Club Brugge
 Belgian First Division A: 2017–18
 Belgian Super Cup: 2018

Midtjylland
 Danish Superliga: 2019–20
 Danish Cup: 2018–19

Urawa Red Diamonds
 Emperor's Cup: 2021
 Japanese Super Cup: 2022

References

External links
 
 
 
 Alexander Scholz at DBU 
 Alexander Scholz  at FCM 

1992 births
Living people
Danish men's footballers
Danish people of German descent
Hedensted IF players
Vejle Boldklub players
Stjarnan players
K.S.C. Lokeren Oost-Vlaanderen players
Standard Liège players
Club Brugge KV players
FC Midtjylland players
Urawa Red Diamonds players
Denmark youth international footballers
Denmark under-21 international footballers
Belgian Pro League players
Danish Superliga players
Danish expatriate men's footballers
Expatriate footballers in Belgium
Danish expatriate sportspeople in Belgium
Expatriate footballers in Iceland
Danish expatriate sportspeople in Iceland
Expatriate footballers in Japan
Danish expatriate sportspeople in Japan
Association football defenders
Footballers from Copenhagen